Homegrown Player Rule may refer to:

 Homegrown Player Rule (Major League Soccer), USA
 Homegrown Player Rule (England)
 Homegrown Player Rule (UEFA)